John Paskin Taylor (18 March 1928 – 9 March 2015) was a British field hockey player who competed in the 1952 Summer Olympics. He was a member of the British field hockey team that won the bronze medal. He played one match as forward.

References
John Paskin Taylor's profile at databaseOlympics
John Paskin Taylor's obituary

External links
 

1928 births
2015 deaths
British male field hockey players
Olympic field hockey players of Great Britain
Field hockey players at the 1952 Summer Olympics
Olympic bronze medallists for Great Britain
Olympic medalists in field hockey
Medalists at the 1952 Summer Olympics